John Thomas "Jocky" Wilson (22 March 1950 – 24 March 2012) was a Scottish professional darts player. After turning pro in 1979, he quickly rose to the top of the game, winning the World Professional Darts Championship in 1982, then again in 1989. Wilson competed in all major darts tournaments of the era and won the British Professional Championship a record four times between 1981 and 1988.

A contemporary and rival of Eric Bristow, Bob Anderson and John Lowe, Wilson's ungainly appearance and rough-hewn lifestyle belied his prowess in the sport. He was dogged by health problems, however, and suddenly retired from the game in December 1995. He withdrew from public life, and was rarely seen in public or gave interviews before his death in March 2012.

In 2022 the new World Seniors Darts Championships was launched with the trophy engraved with the names of four deceased former World Champions on the darts: Wilson, Bristow, Leighton Rees and Andy Fordham.

Early life 
As a child, Wilson's parents were deemed unfit to raise him and Wilson spent much of his childhood in an orphanage. He began playing in a local pub in Kirkcaldy where the landlady supported his interest in darts by giving him a used board to practise on.

Wilson served in the British Army from 1966 to 1968. He also worked as a coal delivery man, fish processor, and also a miner at Kirkcaldy's Seafield Colliery. However, it was a spell of unemployment which was to prove the catalyst to Wilson achieving darting greatness.

In 1979, during this period of unemployment, he entered a darts competition at Butlins, Ayrshire, which he went on to win, claiming the top prize of £500. His success in this tournament convinced him that he should turn professional.

Career

Peak 

In 1981, Wilson beat world number one Eric Bristow and Cliff Lazarenko of England in the BDO Nations Cup final. His Scotland teammates in the 5–4 win were captain Rab Smith and Angus Ross.

His greatest achievements came in the World Championships, first in 1982 where he beat Lowe 5–3 in the final, and then seven years later, when he beat his other great rival Bristow 6–4 in a classic match, where Bristow had recovered from 5–0 down to 5–4 and 2–2 in the tenth set. This was to be the Scot's last taste of success in a major event although the odd final appearance still came over the next few years.

His record at the World Championship was one of great consistency. From his debut in 1979 until 1991 he managed to reach at least the quarter-finals on every single occasion. He was quarter-finalist eight times (1979, 1980, 1981, 1985, 1986, 1988, 1990, 1991) and three-times a losing semi-finalist (1983, 1984, 1987) in addition to his two World titles. In 1992 and 1993 he suffered first round defeats for the only time at the Lakeside Country Club.

He made several guest appearances on television including the popular darts themed quiz show Bullseye hosted by Jim Bowen, on 28 November 1982, produced by Central Television.

In the television documentary, Eric Bristow: Sports Life Stories, Bristow described various psychological ploys he used against his opponents to "scramble their heads". He added that in response the only two opponents who would look him in the eye at the handshake at the start of a game were Wilson and Lowe, saying that like himself they had "no fear". He also referred to Wilson's unorthodox style such as a tendency to jerk his shoulder on throwing the third dart. Bristow commented that it seemed to have no detrimental effect on the accuracy, describing Wilson as "a one off". Bristow stated though that Wilson's sporting demise was due to the increasing volumes of alcoholic spirits Wilson would consume remarking, 'At the end he was doing a 40 oz bottle'.

Darts split 
Wilson joined the other top professionals who split away from the ruling British Darts Organisation in 1993 to form the WDC (now Professional Darts Corporation). He was not able to recapture the form that took him to two world championships however, and only participated in two PDC World Championships, failing to win a single match. He lost both group games in 1994 (to Dennis Priestley and Graeme Stoddart) and again in 1995 (to Priestley and Lowe).

One of the highlights of Wilson's three years in the WDC was him reaching the final of the 1993 WDC Skol UK Matchplay in March 1993, which was broadcast on ITV and played on quadro dartboards. Wilson became one of the few players to have hit 240 on television during a visit to the dart board, by getting 3 darts in the quadruple 20, during his semi final victory over John Lowe. Wilson lost the final to Dennis Priestley.

Wilson reached the quarter-finals of the 1994 World Matchplay, losing to eventual champion Larry Butler. Wilson's final appearance in a televised tournament came in the 1995 World Matchplay. He beat Rod Harrington 8–4 in the first round, but lost to Nigel Justice in the second round. Wilson never appeared in a major televised event again.

Post-retirement 
Wilson never formally announced his retirement from darts; he simply departed from the sport suddenly on 23 December 1995. It is believed that he left after being diagnosed with diabetes, which stopped him drinking during games.

For 10 years during his darts career, Wilson had a house in Wallsend to cut down on travel expenses, but he left that to return to his home town of Kirkcaldy. In 1996, he said, "I don't want anyone feeling sorry for me. There's only one person to blame for the situation I'm in, and that's me." He was declared bankrupt in 1998, and then survived on a disability allowance, living as a recluse in a one-bedroom flat back on the council estate where he grew up. He also suffered from arthritis in his hands.

Wilson ceased giving interviews to the press and television. An Observer reporter tried to interview him in January 2007 on the 25th anniversary of his first title win, only to be told by his wife, "He never has (given an interview) since stopping and never will. He thinks it's all in the past, it's over with." However, Wilson talked briefly to The Scotsman in 2001. Despite his withdrawal from the game, in August 2009 the PDC announced a new tournament called "The Jocky Wilson Cup" in which Scotland's best players played England's best. England beat Scotland 6–0 in the inaugural tournament in December 2009.

A heavy smoker for 40 years, in November 2009 it was announced that Wilson had been diagnosed with chronic obstructive pulmonary disease. Reports stated that he had smoked up to 50 cigarettes a day for most of his life. He died just after 9 p.m. on 24 March 2012 at his home in Kirkcaldy, at the age of 62. His funeral was held on 2 April at Kirkcaldy Crematorium; his rival Eric Bristow and sports presenter Helen Chamberlain were among the estimated 400 mourners.

Personal life 
In 1982, Wilson was temporarily banned from competing in darts tournaments after he allegedly threw a punch at an official during a championship. This was taken as a reaction to Jocky's being under intense pressure at the time of the Falklands War, as he was married to an Argentine woman named Malvina (the Argentine name for the Falkland Islands is "Islas Malvinas"). He was soon allowed back into professional competitions again.

Wilson was a constant sweet-eater and generally refused to brush his teeth ("My Gran told me the English poison the water"); he had lost his last tooth by the age of 28. Following his 1982 World title win, he paid £1,200 for dentures, but never took to them. They made him belch when drinking, he complained.

In popular culture 
In 1982, Wilson's picture was displayed on Top of the Pops during a performance of "Jackie Wilson Said (I'm in Heaven When You Smile)" by Dexys Midnight Runners, apparently as an in-joke on the part of the production staff.
From series 5 to 12, Wilson was one of the darts players depicted in the opening titles of darts-based game show Bullseye.
He was amongst the first sports people to have a computer game created after him. Published by Zeppelin Games, Jocky Wilson's Darts Challenge (1988) and later Jocky Wilson's Darts Compendium (1991) were created for several different home computer systems.
 One of the suites in the fictional Phoenix Club (as seen in Phoenix Nights) was named after Wilson.
In 2019, BBC Scotland broadcast an hour-long documentary about his life called Jocky Wilson Said. The programme featured contributions from Bobby George, Phil Taylor, John Lowe and Bob Anderson, as well as close friends of Jocky. The voiceover consisted of Jocky's own words and was performed by actor Clive Russell. The programme won Best Sports Documentary at the Celtic Media Awards 2020.

World Championship results

BDO 
 1979: Quarter-final (lost to John Lowe 1–3)
 1980: Quarter-final (lost to Eric Bristow 0–3)
 1981: Quarter-final (lost to Tony Brown 2–4)
 1982: Winner (beat John Lowe 5–3)
 1983: 3rd place (beat Tony Brown 2–0; lost in semi-final to Keith Deller 3–5)
 1984: Semi-final (lost to Dave Whitcombe 5–6)
 1985: Quarter-final (lost to Dave Whitcombe 3–4)
 1986: Quarter-final (lost to Dave Whitcombe 2–4)
 1987: Semi-final (lost to John Lowe 0–5)
 1988: Quarter-final (lost to Eric Bristow 2–4)
 1989: Winner (beat Eric Bristow 6–4)
 1990: Quarter-final (lost to Mike Gregory 3–4)
 1991: Quarter-final (lost to Kevin Kenny 3–4)
 1992: First round (lost to Kevin Kenny 1–3)
 1993: First round (lost to Dennis Priestley 0–3)

PDC 
 1994: Group stage (lost both group games to Dennis Priestley and Graeme Stoddart)
 1995: Group stage (lost both group games to Dennis Priestley and John Lowe)

Performance timeline

References

External links 
"A Sporting Nation" – article from bbc.co.uk
Jocky's dart out of the shadows The Scotsman, 17 March 2001
DartsDatabase profile and stats

1950 births
2012 deaths
Scottish darts players
Sportspeople from Kirkcaldy
BDO world darts champions
Scottish miners
British Darts Organisation players
Professional Darts Corporation founding players